Nitty Gritty Surround is the 2001 DVD-Video and DVD-Audio release by John McEuen &
Jimmy Ibbotson. It consists of a live in studio recording. It was recorded November 17, 2000 at the Historic Fox Theater, Hanford, California.

Both are former members of the Nitty Gritty Dirt Band.

The DVD-Video can be viewed with an "Audience mix" or the "Stage" mix. The DVD-Audio side is "Stage" Mix. The "Stage" mix surrounds you like you are on stage with the musicians.

The DVD cover credits John McEuen & Jimmy Ibbotson featuring Special Appearance by Jennifer
Warnes. The DVD main menu, however, credits the DVD to John McEuen and the String Wizards
Featuring Special Appearance BY Jennifer Warnes and Jimmy Ibbotson.

Track listing
"Miner's Night Out" (John McEuen) - 3:19
"Darcy Farrow" (Tom Campbell & Steve Gillette) - 4:08 - Lead vocal Jimmy, harmony vocal Jennifer
"Moonlight Dancing" (John McEuen) - 3:54
"Acoustic Traveler" (John McEuen) - 4:08
"Somewhere Somebody" (John McEuen) - 2:29 - Vocals Jennifer
"Too Late Love Comes To Me" (Gronenthal / McNally / Kastner) - 4:36 - Vocal Jennifer
"Shady Grove" (Gronenthal / McNally / Kastner) - 3:15 - Vocals Jonathan
"The Oak And The Laurel" (Laurie Lewis) - 4:59 - Vocals - Laurie
"Swing To Bop" (Charles Christian) - 5:25
"It's Morning" (Jimmy Ibbotson) - 3:43 - Vocals Jimmy
"Blue Days, Sleepless Nights" (Laurie Lewis) - 5:02 - Vocals Laurie

Personnel
John McEuen - Banjo, guitar, mandolin
Jimmie Ibbotson - Vocals, bass, mandolin, guitar, percussion
Jennifer Warnes - Vocals
Laurie Lewis - Guitar, vocals
Tom Rozum - Mandolin, vocals
Jonathon McEuen - Guitar, vocals
Matt Cartsonis - Harmony vocals, mandolin, dulcimer
Tom Corbett - Mandolin
Rick Cunha - Guitar, ukulele, vocals
Phil Salazar - Fiddle
Randy Tico - Acoustic bass
Jim Christie - Drums, percussion

Production
Producer - Mark Waldrep and John McEuen

References

2001 albums
Jimmy Ibbotson albums
John McEuen albums